Darko Anić (born 1957) is a French chess player originally from Croatia. He was awarded the title of Grandmaster in 1999.

References 

Chess grandmasters
1957 births
Living people